The effects of Tropical Storm Allison in Texas included 23 deaths caused by extreme flooding. The first storm of the 2001 Atlantic hurricane season, Tropical Storm Allison lasted unusually long for a June storm, remaining tropical or subtropical for 15 days. The storm developed from a tropical wave in the northern Gulf of Mexico on June 4, and struck the Texas coast shortly thereafter. It drifted northward through the state, turned back to the south, and re-entered the Gulf of Mexico. The storm continued to the east-northeast, made landfall on Louisiana, then moved across the southeast United States and Mid-Atlantic. Allison was the first storm since Tropical Storm Frances in 1998 to strike the northern Texas coastline.

Tropical Storm Allison was a major flood disaster throughout its path from Texas to the Mid-Atlantic. Allison killed 41 people, of whom 27 drowned. The storm also caused over $8.7 billion in damage (2001 USD, $12.78 billion 2020 USD), making Allison the costliest and second-deadliest tropical storm on record in the United States.

Preparations 
After the storm made landfall, flash flood watches and warnings were issued for numerous areas in eastern Texas. Travel was discouraged due to the threat of flash flood. During the flood event, the National Weather Service in Houston issued 99 flash flood warnings with an average lead time of 40 minutes; only nine warnings were false alarms.

Shortly after the storm formed, officials in Galveston County, Texas issued a voluntary evacuation for the western end of Galveston Island, as the area was not protected by the Galveston Seawall. The ferry from the island to the Bolivar Peninsula was closed, while voluntary evacuations were issued in Surfside in Brazoria County. Voluntary evacuations were also suggested near Sabine Pass in Jefferson County, Texas, though few left. Also, when the National Hurricane Center issued the first advisory on Allison, officials issued Tropical Storm Warnings from Sargent, Texas to Morgan City, Louisiana, just three hours before tropical storm winds were observed.

Impact 

Allison made landfall with a storm surge of two to three feet. Combined with waves on top, areas of Galveston Island experienced a wall of water  in height, creating overwash along the coastline. While Allison was stalling over Texas, it dropped heavy rainfall across the state, including  in Galveston,  in Jamaica Beach, Texas, and other similar totals along the coast. Minimal beach erosion was reported, and impact was minimal near the coast. While moving northward through Texas as a minimal tropical depression, Allison produced minor wind gusts. Shortly after making landfall, the storm spawned a tornado in Manvel of Brazoria County, causing damage to one home.

Houston experienced torrential rainfall in a short amount of time. At one site,  fell in just one hour, while  fell in only 12 hours. Houston Hobby Airport received 20.84 inches of rain from June 5 to 10, 2001, while Bush Intercontinental Airport received 16.48 inches. Two-thirds of the bayous and creeks in Harris County experienced 500-year flood events. Houston Intercontinental Airport, which typically receives  of rain in a year, experienced 35.7% of its expected total in the first nine days of June.

The deluge flooded 95,000 automobiles and 73,000 houses throughout Harris County. Tropical Storm Allison destroyed 2,744 homes, leaving 30,000 homeless with residential damages totaling to $1.76 billion (2001 USD, $2.05 billion 2007 USD). Residential neighborhoods inside and to the north of Interstate 610 were hardest hit. Additionally, five of the six bayou systems in downtown Houston were severely flooded. Four of them broke 100-year high-water records, causing excessive surface run-off.

Several hospitals in the Texas Medical Center, the largest medical complex in the world, experienced severe damage from the storm, which hit quickly and with unexpected fury on a Friday evening. Hospital personnel were forced to evacuate thousands of patients in a major effort that included Coast Guard and Army helicopters. Patients who could not breathe on their own had to be continuously manually ventilated during the evacuation, which lasted hours. Most hospitals lost power and backup power when basements, the area where power and research data were kept, flooded. The Baylor College of Medicine experienced major damage, totaling $495 million (2001 USD, $577 million 2007 USD). The medical school lost 90,000 research animals, 60,000 tumor samples, and 25 years of research data. The University of Texas Health Science Center at Houston, across the street, lost thousands of laboratory animals, including expensive genetic-specific mice. Decades of research was lost, including, for many scientists, their life's work. The UT-Houston gross anatomy lab, cyclotron, and other important facilities were completely destroyed. Throughout the Medical Center, damage totaled to over $2 billion (2001 USD, $2.3 billion 2007 USD). Most were reopened after a month, though it took much longer to become fully operational.

The storm flooded the lower level of the massive law library at the University of Houston Law Center with eight feet of water. An estimated 174,000 books and the microfiche collection were destroyed. The Federal Emergency Management Agency (FEMA) gave $21.4 million to rebuild the law library collection.

The tunnel system, which connects most large office buildings in downtown Houston, was submerged, as were many streets and parking garages adjacent to Buffalo Bayou. In the Houston Theater District, also near Buffalo Bayou in the northern part of downtown, the Houston Ballet, Houston Symphony, Houston Grand Opera, and Alley Theater lost millions of dollars' worth of costumes, musical instruments, sheet music, archives, props, and other artifacts.

Local television stations ran all-night coverage of the deluge from June 8 through the next day, including KHOU-TV 11, which was forced to transmit its broadcast to a satellite truck when floodwaters entered its production studio on the Allen Parkway near Studemont/Montrose, near downtown along the banks of Buffalo Bayou. By midnight on June 9 nearly every freeway and major road in the city was under several feet of water, forcing hundreds of motorists to abandon their vehicles for higher ground. Eighteen-wheeled trucks were filmed floating down major freeways and highways, swept along by floodwaters.

Despite massive flooding and damage to entire neighborhoods, there were no drowning deaths in flooded homes. In the area, there were 12 deaths from driving, 6 from walking, 3 from electrocution, and 1 in an elevator. Elsewhere in Texas, a man drowned when swimming in a ditch in Mauriceville. Damage totaled to $5.2 billion (2001 USD, $6 billion 2007 USD) throughout Texas.

Though Allison's flooding was extreme, it was not unprecedented.

Aftermath 

Within weeks of the disaster, President George W. Bush declared 28 counties in Texas as disaster areas. The declarations allowed affected citizens to receive aid for temporary housing, emergency home repairs, and other serious disaster-related expenses. The Federal Emergency Management Agency (FEMA) also provided 75% for the cost of debris removal, emergency services related to the disaster, and repairing or replacing damaged public facilities, such as roads, bridges and utilities.

A few weeks after Allison, FEMA opened six disaster recovery centers across southeast Texas, which provided recovery information to those who applied for disaster assistance. The American Red Cross and the Salvation Army opened 48 shelters at the peak of need for people driven from their homes, which served nearly 300,000 meals. After the extensive damage to Houston hospitals, the U. S. Public Health Service team set up a temporary hospital at the Houston Police Academy. The team of 87 medical personnel served over 1,000 patients within two weeks of Allison's passage. Similarly, the National Disaster Medical System deployed a temporary hospital to Houston with 88 professionals, aiding nearly 500 people. Debris removal, which was initially slow, was aided by FEMA to expedite the removal process. FEMA provided 75% of the federal cost of the removal. Thirty-five volunteer services provided aid for the flood victims in Texas, including food, clothing, and volunteers to help repair the houses.

After nearly 50,000 cars were flooded and ruined, many people attempted to sell the cars across the country without telling of the car's history. Following the extreme flooding, a mosquito outbreak occurred, though FEMA provided aid to control the problem. Health officials also recommended disinfecting private wells with bleach, due to possible contamination from the severe flooding. Many people took advantage of the flood victims, including fraudulent contractors and suppliers raising the price of goods more than is actually justified.

By six months after the storm, around 120,000 Texas citizens applied for federal disaster aid, totaling to $1.05 billion (2001 USD, $1.22 billion 2007 USD). Of that amount, 17% of that was spent for temporary housing. In addition, Disaster Unemployment Assistance totaled to just under $1 million, while business loans totaled to $389 million (2001 USD, $454 million 2007 USD).

See also 

 Meteorological history of Tropical Storm Allison

References

External links 

 National Hurricane Center Tropical Cyclone Report on Allison
 US National Hurricane Center Tropical Storm Allison advisory archive
 HPC Storm Summary/Advisory Archive for Allison
 HPC Final Storm Summary/Wrap-Up of Allison
 HPC Rainfall Summary for Allison
 NWS Service Assessment (PDF)
 Tropical Storm Allison Recovery Project Community resources and continuing research of the continued flood threat to Houston
 Houston/Galveston National Weather Service Report

Tropical Storm Allison
Allison
2001 in Texas
Allison
Allison